WJPF (1340 AM) is a radio station broadcasting a News Talk Information format. Licensed to Herrin, Illinois, United States, the station serves the Marion-Carbondale area.  The station is currently owned by Max Media, licensed to MRR License LLC, and features programming from ABC Radio.

Ownership
In December 2003, Mississippi River Radio, acting as Max Media LLC (John Trinder, president/COO), reached an agreement to purchase WCIL, WCIL-FM, WJPF, WOOZ-FM, WUEZ, WXLT, KCGQ-FM, KEZS-FM, KGIR, KGKS, KJEZ, KKLR-FM, KLSC, KMAL, KSIM, KWOC, and KZIM from the Zimmer Radio Group (James L. Zimmer, owner). The reported value of this 17 station transaction was $43 million.

References

External links

JPF
News and talk radio stations in the United States
Radio stations established in 1982
1982 establishments in Illinois
Max Media radio stations